Nova Iguaçu Futebol Clube, or Nova Iguaçu as they are usually called, is a Brazilian football team from Nova Iguaçu in Rio de Janeiro, founded on 1 April 1990.

Nova Iguaçu greatest rival is from the same city: Artsul.

Home stadium is the Jânio Moraes stadium, capacity 16,000. They play in orange shirts, white shorts and orange socks.

History

Nova Iguaçu Futebol Clube was founded on 1 April 1990, by the initiative of 25 self-employed persons, led by Jânio Moraes. The foundation project was idealized in 1988/1989, by Jânio Moraes, and supported by the 25 self-employed people. 1994 World Cup champion Zinho is one of the founders of the club and was a director-partner of the club.

In 1994, only four years after the club's foundation, Nova Iguaçu won the Campeonato Carioca Third Level, and gained promotion to the state championship second level.

In 2005, after a successful campaign, Nova Iguaçu won the Campeonato Carioca Second Level and was promoted to the 2006 Campeonato Carioca First Division.

On January 14, 2006, Nova Iguaçu played their first ever Campeonato Carioca first division match, against the major club Flamengo, at Estádio Raulino de Oliveira, where the club won 1-0. However, Flamengo's players were youngsters.

On June 21, 2008, the club won the Copa Rio for the first time, after beating Americano 3-2 at Estádio Godofredo Cruz, Campos dos Goytacazes, home of the opponent club.

Achievements

Major competitions
 Copa Rio:
 Winners (2): 2008, 2012
Campeonato Carioca First Level:
Troféu Edílson Silva de 2012
 Campeonato Carioca Série A2:
 Winners (3): 2005, 2016, 2020
 Campeonato Carioca Série B1:
 Winners (1): 1994

Other competitions
 Copa João Ellis Filho:
 Winners (1): 2005
 Olimpíada da Baixada Fluminense:
 Winners (1): 2005
 Campeonato Iguaçuano:
 Winners (1): 2005
 Segundo Turno do Estadual de Profissionais do Módulo Especial:
 Winners (1): 1996
 Primeiro Turno de Profissionais da Série Intermediária:
 Winners (1): 1995

Youth competitions

 Volta Redonda Youth Tournament:
 Winners (1): 1991
 Torneio Otávio Pinto Guimarães de Juniores:
 Winners (1): 1996
 Juniores da Série Intermediária:
 Winners (1): 1995
 AERJ Youth Championship:
 Winners (1): 1992

Stadium

Nova Iguaçu's home stadium is Estádio Jânio Moraes, also known as Estádio Laranjão, inaugurated in 2009, with a maximum capacity of 5,000 people.

Nova Iguaçu's previously home stadium was Estádio Giulite Coutinho, also known as Estádio Édson Passos, inaugurated in 2000, with a maximum capacity of 16,000 people.

Players

First team squad

Out on loan

Club colors and nickname
The club is affectionately known as "Carrossel da Baixada" (Baixada's Carrousel), in reference to the team color (orange), similar to the color of the Netherlands' 1974 World Cup team (known as the Dutch Carrousel). The color adopted by the club was orange, in honor to the period (in the 1930s) when Nova Iguaçu city was one of the biggest orange exporters in the world (the fruit still is one of the city symbols).

References

External links
 Official Website

Football clubs in Rio de Janeiro (state)
Association football clubs established in 1990
 
1990 establishments in Brazil